Strasburg Historic District is a national historic district located at Strasburg, Shenandoah County, Virginia. The district encompasses 206 contributing buildings and 1 contributing site in the town of Strasburg.  It includes a variety of commercial, residential, and institutional buildings dating from the 18th to 20th centuries.  Notable buildings include the George Eberly House, Presbyterian Church (c. 1830), Alton House, Spengler Hall (c. 1830), Spengler's Mill (1794), Bell Pottery (pre-1878), Strasburg Christian Church, Strasburg Methodist Church (1905), St. Paul's Lutheran Church (1892), First National Bank (c. 1910), Home Theatre (1930s), Strasburg School (1910) and the Sonner House (1757).

It was listed on the National Register of Historic Places in 1984.

References

Historic districts in Shenandoah County, Virginia
National Register of Historic Places in Shenandoah County, Virginia
Victorian architecture in Virginia
Historic districts on the National Register of Historic Places in Virginia